We're All Gonna Die (Even Jay Baruchel) is a Canadian documentary television series, which premiered April 30, 2022, on Crave. Hosted by Jay Baruchel, the series explores the science behind various ways in which the end of the human race could come about, including asteroids, nuclear war, pandemics, alien invasion, volcanic eruptions and climate change, providing expert insight into both the scope of the challenges and their potential solutions. The series is produced, directed and written by Victoria Lean. 

The first episode of the series received a preview screening at the 2022 Hot Docs Canadian International Documentary Festival.

References

2022 Canadian television series debuts
2020s Canadian documentary television series
Crave original programming